Ingrid Julia Chavez (born 1965) is an American singer-songwriter, poet, actress, and visual artist.

Early life
Chavez was born on January 21, 1965, in Albuquerque, New Mexico, and raised in Marietta, Georgia. She is of Mexican-American descent. At the young age of seventeen, the ambitious and driven single mother decided to move to Minneapolis, Minnesota, and pursue a career in music.

Career
After moving to Minneapolis, Minnesota, in 1986, she auditioned for a number of bands, made the rounds of the Minneapolis music scene, and paid her bills working in a coffee shop. She met Prince in a pub in late 1987, having written to him. Impressed by Chavez's voice and poetry, Prince took Chavez under his wing. She was known as The Spirit Child on his 1988 Lovesexy album. Prince encouraged Chavez to write 21 poems with the promise that they would make a poetry album together. In January 1988, Ingrid and Prince recorded The Poetry Session at Paisley Park Studios. Prince improvised on keyboards while Ingrid recited her poetry. Shortly after this session the project was put on hold.

In 1989, Chavez formed a band called Skyfish with Richard Werbowenko. They created a six-song album released only on cassette. Chavez ran into Prince a year or so later and handed him a copy of the Skyfish demo. Shortly after the exchange, Prince contacted Chavez and wanted her to listen to a track that he had just finished with the poem "Heaven Must Be Near". Prince asked Chavez to finish the poetry album.

It was at this time that Chavez was asked to play the part of Prince's romantic interest in his 1990 film Graffiti Bridge. During the filming Chavez went into the studio with Lenny Kravitz and Andre Betts and co-wrote and recorded what became Madonna's sultry 1990 hit "Justify My Love". She received a large out-of-court settlement for not being credited on the single's release.

In 1992, not long after recording vocals with David Sylvian for the songs "Heartbeat (Tainai Kaiki II)--Returning to the Womb" and "Cloud #9" on Ryuichi Sakamoto's 1991 album Heartbeat, Chavez married Sylvian, and over the years contributed her trademark breathy vocals to a number of her baritone-voiced husband's releases.

During the mid-1990s, Chavez worked with Sylvian and Werbowenko on a second solo album titled Little Girls with 99 Lives. Chavez and Sylvian sent out demos to record labels and close friends, yet could not strike up interest in a deal. The album would have included tracks entitled "Lighthouse", "Snowfall", "Whose Trip Is This?", "Starred and Dreaming", "Kall/Les Fleurs Du Mal", and "Remembering Julia"—the latter four of which can be found as B-sides on the 2-CD UK single of David Sylvian's "I Surrender". Little Girl with 99 Lives Ep is scheduled for digital release in 2016 through Ingrid's Ten Windows records.

In 1996, Tommy Roberts, a former Minneapolis recording engineer who recorded the Skyfish demo, contacted Chavez and asked her to be in a band with him. She joined the band, called Ova, and recorded a four-song EP. Chavez became pregnant and decided to let go of the project and focus on her family.

Chavez teamed up with Chicago native, Marc Valentin to form the duo Black Eskimo in 2011. The 12-song full-length Deep & Heady CD was released on November 25, 2013, via Bandcamp. Their song "My Sky" won for Song of the Year (Spoken Word Category) at the 14th Annual Independent Music Awards. In celebration of this award the My Sky Poetry and Music Journal was released. This was the first album released in a physical format as a poetry and music journal.

Ingrid's third solo album was due to be released in late 2018. Memories of Flying features collaborations with Charles Webster, Ganga, Mashti, Deep Dive Corp., Marco Valentin, and David Hurn.

Personal life
Chavez has a son, Tinondre, born circa 1984, who lived in Atlanta, Georgia, for a time. She also has two daughters, Ameera and Isobel, with English singer and musician David Sylvian, whom she married in 1992 and divorced twelve years later; the disintegration of the marriage informed Sylvian's 2003 studio album Blemish. Chavez currently lives in New Hampshire focusing on photography, writing and new recording projects.

Discography

Ingrid Chavez 

Ingrid Chavez is Chavez's debut solo album, which was released in 1991 on Paisley Park Records. The album was initially intended to set her spoken-word poetry to music supplied by Prince. It was recorded gradually from late 1987 to mid-1991. When Warner Bros. pushed for the album to have sung vocals in place of the spoken word, Prince abandoned the project. Five of the album's tracks ("Elephant Box", "Slappy Dappy", "Jadestone", "Whispering Dandelions" and "Heaven Must Be Near") ended up as spoken word with atmospheric music by Prince under his Paisley Park alias, and the remainder were relatively poppy tracks with sung vocals, co-produced by Ingrid with Prince's studio hands Michael Koppelman and Levi Seacer Jr.

The album spawned three singles, "Elephant Box," "Hippy Blood," and "Heaven Must Be Near." Each were supported with remix packages that featured contributions by Eric Kupper, Junior Vasquez, and Larry 'Tee' Robinson.

Little Girls With 99 Lives 
Release date: 2010

Label: Ten Windows Records

Format: Compact Disc, Digital

A Flutter and Some Words 
A Flutter and Some Words is Chavez's second album, released on January 25, 2010, on her own label, Ten Window Records. It consists of Chavez's poetry and lyrics set to the instrumentation of Lorenzo Scopelliti (aka Saffron Wood) and Richard Werbowenko (on the title track) and recorded by Alessandro Mazzitelli.

By the Water Reimagined EP 
Released: 2010

Label: Ten Windows Records

Format: CD

Deep EP

Heady EP

Deep & Heady

Memories Of Flying 
Release date: May 17, 2019

Singles and Appearances 

Ganga feat. Ingrid Chavez "Non Toxic"
Ganga feat. Ingrid Chavez "Non Toxic Remixed EP"
Vanessa Daou "Revolution (Black Eskimo's Memories of Flying Re-imagining)"
P.C. Muñoz (feat. Ingrid Chavez)  "Disappear"
Saffon Wood  "Visit Dream (feat. Ingrid Chavez)" [2017]
Mashti "Out of Love (feat. Ingrid Chavez)" [2018]
"You Gave Me Wings" [2018]
"Ride (Balearic Mix by Deep Dive Corp.)" [2019]
"All The Love In The World" [2019]
"Light Rays" [2019]

References

External links
 
 Biography
 
 

1965 births
Living people
American women singers
American musicians of Mexican descent
Songwriters from Georgia (U.S. state)
People from Marietta, Georgia
Paisley Park Records artists
Singers from Georgia (U.S. state)
American poets of Mexican descent
American women poets
People from Peterborough, New Hampshire
21st-century American poets
Hispanic and Latino American musicians
21st-century American women
Hispanic and Latino American women singers